Ixhuatlancillo is in the central zone of the state of Veracruz, Mexico, about 165 km from state capital Xalapa.

The municipality of Ixhuatlancillo is delimited to the north by La Perla, to the east by Mariano Escobedo, to the south by Orizaba, Río Blanco and Nogales and to the west by Maltrata.

It produces principally maize, coffee and sugarcane.

On February 2, each year, there is a celebration in honor of Virgen de la Candelaria, patron of the town.

The weather in Ixhuatlancillo is cool all year with rains in summer and autumn.

References

External links 

  Municipal Official webpage
  Municipal Official Information

Municipalities of Veracruz